Idris Alooma, Idris ibn 'Ali (Alooma), or Idriss Alaoma, (r. 1570–1602/03 or 1580–1617) was Mai (king) of the Kanem-Bornu Empire, located mainly in Chad, Cameroon, Niger and Nigeria. His name is more properly written Idris Alawma or Idris Alauma. An outstanding statesman, under his rule Kanem-Bornu touched the zenith of its power. Idris is remembered for his military skills, administrative reforms and Islamic piety. His feats are mainly known through his chronicler Ahmad bin Fartuwa.

Life
He succeeded queen Aissa Koli.

His main adversaries were the Hausa to the west, the Tuareg and Toubou to the north, and the Bulala to the east. One epic poem extols his victories in 330 wars and more than 1,000 battles. His innovations included the employment of fixed military camps with walls, permanent sieges and scorched earth tactics where soldiers burned everything in their path, armored horses and riders as well as the use of Berber camelry, Kotoko boatmen, and iron-helmeted musketeers trained by Ottoman military advisers. His active diplomacy featured relations with Tripoli, Egypt, and the Ottoman Empire, which sent a 200-member ambassadorial party across the desert to Alooma's court at Ngazargamu. Alooma also signed what was probably the first written treaty or ceasefire in Chadian history.

Alooma introduced a number of legal and administrative reforms based on his religious beliefs and Islamic law. He sponsored the construction of numerous mosques and made a pilgrimage to Mecca, where he arranged for the establishment of a hostel to be used by pilgrims from his empire. As with other dynamic politicians, Alooma's reformist goals led him to seek loyal and competent advisers and allies, and he frequently relied on slaves who had been educated in noble homes. Alooma regularly sought advice from a council composed of heads of the most important clans. He required major political figures to live at the court, and he reinforced political alliances through appropriate marriages (Alooma himself was the son of a Kanuri father and a Bulala mother).

Kanem-Bornu under Alooma was strong and wealthy. Government revenue came from tribute (or booty if the recalcitrant people had to be conquered) and duties on and participation in trade. Unlike West Africa, the Chadian region did not have gold. Still, it was central to one of the most convenient routes across the Sahara desert. Between Lake Chad and Fezzan lay a sequence of well-spaced wells and oases and from Fezzan there were easy connections to North Africa and the Mediterranean. Many products were sent north, including natron (sodium carbonate), cotton, kola nuts, ivory, ostrich feathers, perfume, wax, and hides, but the most profitable trade was in slaves. Imports included salt, horses, silk, glass, muskets, and copper.

Alooma took a keen interest in trade and other economic matters. He is credited with having cleared the roads, designed better boats for Lake Chad, introduced standard units of measure for grain, and moving farmers into new lands. In addition, he improved the ease and security of transit through the empire with the goal of making it so safe that "a lone woman clad in gold might walk with none to fear but God."

Trivia
In 2013, Magnus Edet became the youngest award-winning film director in Nollywood and dedicated it to Idris Alooma believing he was indeed a strong man during his reign on earth as a freedom fighter.

See also
 Ibn Furtu
 Chronology of the Sefuwa (Kanem-Bornu)
 Sayfawa dynasty
 Bornu Empire

Bibliography
 Barkindo, Bawuro: "The early states of the Central Sudan", in: J. Ajayi and M. Crowder (eds.), The History of West Africa, vol. I, 3rd ed. Harlow 1985, 225-254.
 Dewière, Rémi, L'esclave, le savant et le sultan. Représentations du monde et diplomatie au sultanat du Borno (XVIe-XVIIe siècles), thèse de doctorat dirigée par le professeur Bertrand Hirsch, Université Paris 1 Panthéon Sorbonne, 2015, 713 f.
 Hunwick, John: "Songhay, Bornu and Hausaland in the sixteenth century", in: J. Ajayi and M. Crowder (eds.), The History of West Africa, vol. I, 1st ed. London 1971, 202-239.
 Ibn Furṭū: "The Kanem wars", in: Herbert R. Palmer: Sudanese Memoirs, vol. I, Lagos 1928, p. 15-81.
 Lange, Dierk: Le Dīwān des sultans du Kanem-Bornu, Wiesbaden 1977.
 --: ''A Sudanic Chronicle: the Borno Expeditions of Idrīs Alauma'to', Wiesbaden 1987.

References

External links
 

16th-century births
1617 deaths
Rulers of the Bornu Empire
16th-century monarchs in Africa
17th-century monarchs in Africa
16th-century Nigerian people
17th-century Nigerian people